Nancy W. Y. Ho (born 1936) is a Chinese-American molecular biologist who was the recipient of the 2013 USA National Medal of Technology and Innovation, awarded to her
by President Barack Obama.
The award is the highest honor for technological achievement bestowed by the President of the United States.

She was awarded the medal for: "For the development of a yeast-based technology that is able to co-ferment sugars extracted from plants to produce ethanol, and for optimizing this technology for large-scale and cost-effective production of renewable biofuels and industrial chemicals."

President Obama's citation at the award ceremony read:

Early life
Ho was born in China. Ho grew up in Taiwan.
Ho is a Taiwanese American.

Education 
Ho earned her PhD in molecular biology in 1968, her masters from Temple University in 1960, and her undergraduate degree from National Taiwan University, Taiwan in 1957.

Career
In 2006, Ho founded GreenTech America Inc. in West Lafayette, Indiana. Ho is also the President of GreenTech America Inc. Ho is known for the yeast called Ho-Purdue Yeast.

Ho is a research professor emerita at Purdue University.
Earlier on, she was a senior research scientist at Purdue Laboratory of Renewable Resources
Engineering (LORRE). In 2007, she became a research professor at Purdue, in the School of
Chemical Engineering.

For over 30 years, she has devoted research to develop the most successful yeast for the production of ethanol. This has considerable impact in the renewable energy field.

Awards

 National Medal of Technology and Innovation (2013)

Book

References

External links 
 Nancy Ho Publications listing from Purdue

1936 births
Living people
American people of Taiwanese descent
National Taiwan University alumni
Temple University alumni
Purdue University faculty